Avraham Shekhterman (born 1910, died 7 December 1986) was an Israeli politician who served as a member of the Knesset for Gahal and Likud between 1969 and 1977. He was the older brother of Herzl Shafir, a former IDF general.

Biography
Born in Odessa in the Russian Empire (today in Ukraine), Shekhterman made aliyah to Mandatory Palestine in 1924. He attended high school in Tel Aviv and in 1927 he joined Betar, later becoming one of its commanders. He studied civil engineering at Ghent University, where he chaired the Jewish Students Organisation, as well as working as a Betar instructor in Antwerp.

He helped establish Kfar Yavetz in 1932. In 1936 he joined the Betar faction of the Haganah, later becoming an Irgun member after it broke away from the Haganah. In 1938 he became political editor of the HaMashkif newspaper, the publication of the Revisionist Party.

Shekhterman was involved in promoting aviation in Palestine. In preparation for establishing a Jewish air force, he used his contacts to convince the British Mandate's Department of Civilian Aviation to approve a flight school at an  airfield in Lod.

Between 1939 and 1945 he chaired the Tel Aviv Pilots Club.

Political career
Shekhterman served as a member of the Assembly of Representatives. In 1955 he was elected to Tel Aviv city council, remaining a member until 1965 and serving as deputy mayor between 1957 and 1959. In 1969 he was elected to the Knesset on the Gahal list. He was re-elected in 1973, by which time Gahal had merged into Likud, but lost his seat in the 1977 elections.

Business career
Between 1943 and 1946 he managed the Potash Company at the Dead Sea.

References

External links

1910 births
1986 deaths
Betar members
Gahal politicians
Ghent University alumni
Haganah members
Irgun members
Israeli aviators
Israeli chief executives
Israeli journalists
Likud politicians
Members of the Assembly of Representatives (Mandatory Palestine)
Members of the 7th Knesset (1969–1974)
Members of the 8th Knesset (1974–1977)
Odesa Jews
Soviet emigrants to Mandatory Palestine
20th-century journalists